Beshalach, Beshallach, or Beshalah (—Hebrew for "when [he] let go" (literally: "in (having) sent"), the second word and first distinctive word in the parashah) is the sixteenth weekly Torah portion (parashah) in the annual Jewish cycle of Torah reading and the fourth in the Book of Exodus. It constitutes . In this parashah, Pharaoh changes his mind and chases after the Israelite people with his army, trapping them at the Sea of Reeds. God commands Moses to split the sea, allowing them to pass, then closes the sea back upon the Egyptian army. There are miracles of manna and clean water. Also, the nation of Amalek attacks, and the Israelite people are victorious.

The parashah is made up of 6,423 Hebrew letters, 1,681 Hebrew words, 116 verses, and 216 lines in a Torah Scroll (Sefer Torah).

Jews read it the sixteenth Sabbath after Simchat Torah, in January or February. As the parashah describes God's deliverance of the Israelites from Egypt, Jews also read part of the parashah, as the initial Torah reading for the seventh day of Passover. And Jews also read the part of the parashah about Amalek, on Purim, which commemorates the story of Esther and the Jewish people's victory over Haman's plan to kill the Jews, told in the book of Esther.  identifies Haman as an Agagite, and thus a descendant of Amalek.  identifies the Agagites with the Amalekites. A Midrash tells that between King Agag's capture by Saul and his killing by Samuel, Agag fathered a child, from whom Haman in turn descended.

The parashah is notable for the Song of the Sea, which is traditionally chanted using a different melody and is written by the scribe using a distinctive brick-like pattern in the Torah scroll. The Sabbath when it is read is known as Shabbat Shirah, as the Song of the Sea is sometimes known as the Shirah (song). Some communities’ customs for this day include feeding birds and reciting the Song of the Sea out loud in the regular prayer service.

The haftarah for Beshalach tells the story of Deborah. At 52 verses, it is the longest haftarah.

Readings
In the Masoretic Text of the Tanakh (Hebrew Bible), Parashat Beshalach has eight "open portion" (petuchah) divisions (roughly equivalent to paragraphs, often abbreviated with the Hebrew letter  (peh)). Parashat Beshalach has four further subdivisions, called "closed portion" (setumah) divisions (abbreviated with the Hebrew letter  (samekh)) within the open portion divisions. The first open portion divides the first reading. The second open portion covers the balance of the first and all of the second readings. The third open portion is coincident with the third reading. The fourth open portion covers the fourth and fifth readings. The fifth open portion is coincident with the sixth reading. The sixth and seventh open portion divisions divide the seventh reading. And the eighth open portion is coincident with the maftir reading that concludes the parashah. Closed portion divisions separate the fourth and fifth readings, and divide the fifth and sixth readings.

First reading—Exodus 13:17–14:8
In the first reading, when Pharaoh let the Israelites go, God led the people roundabout by way of the Sea of Reeds. Moses took the bones of Joseph with them. God went before them in a pillar of cloud by day and in a pillar of fire by night. The first open portion ends here with the end of chapter .

In the continuation of the reading in chapter , God told Moses to tell the Israelites to turn back and encamp by the sea, so that Pharaoh might think that the Israelites were trapped and follow after them. When Pharaoh learned that the people had fled, he had a change of heart, and he chased the Israelites with chariots. The first reading ends here.

Second reading—Exodus 14:9–14
In the short second reading, Pharaoh overtook the Israelites by the sea. Greatly frightened, the Israelites cried out to God and complained to Moses. Moses told the people not to fear, for God would fight for them. The second reading and second open portion end here.

Third reading—Exodus 14:15–25
In the third reading, God told Moses to lift up his rod, hold out his arm, and split the sea. Moses did so, and God drove back the sea with a strong east wind, and the Israelites marched through on dry ground, the waters forming walls on their right and left. The Egyptians pursued, but God slowed them by locking their chariot wheels. The third reading and the third open portion end here.

Fourth reading—Exodus 14:26–15:26
In the long fourth reading, on God's instruction, Moses held out his arm, and the waters covered the chariots, the horsemen, and all the Egyptians. Moses and the Israelites—and then Miriam—sang a song to God, celebrating how God hurled horse and driver into the sea. The fourth reading and a closed portion end here.

Fifth reading—Exodus 15:27–16:10
In the short fifth reading, the Israelites went three days into the wilderness and found no water. When they came to Marah, they could not drink the bitter water, so they grumbled against Moses. God showed Moses a piece of wood to throw into the water, and the water became sweet. God told Moses that if he would diligently hearken to God and obey God's commandments, then God would give the Israelites none of the diseases that God had given the Egyptians. A closed portion ends here.

In the continuation of the reading, the Israelites traveled to the springs and palms of Elim, and then came to the wilderness of Sin and grumbled in hunger against Moses and Aaron. A closed portion ends here.

In the continuation of the reading, God told Moses that God would rain bread from heaven, and twice as much on the sixth day. Moses and Aaron told the Israelites that they would see God's glory, for God had heard their murmurings against God, and the Israelites saw God's glory appear in a cloud. The fifth reading and the fourth open portion end here.

Sixth reading—Exodus 16:11–36
In the sixth reading, God heard their grumbling, and in the evening quail covered the camp, and in the morning fine flaky manna covered the ground like frost. The Israelites gathered as much of it as they required; those who gathered much had no excess, and those who gathered little had no deficiency. Moses instructed none to leave any of it over until morning, but some did, and it became infested with maggots and stank. On the sixth day they gathered double the food, Moses instructed them to put aside the excess until morning, and it did not turn foul the next day, the Sabbath. Moses told them that on the Sabbath, they would not find any manna on the plain, yet some went out to gather and found nothing. A closed portion ends here.

In the continuation of the reading, Moses ordered that a jar of the manna be kept throughout the ages. The Israelites ate manna 40 years. The sixth reading and the fifth open portion end here with the end of chapter .

Seventh reading—Exodus 17:1–16
In the seventh reading, in chapter , when the Israelites encamped at Rephidim, there was no water and the people quarreled with Moses, asking why Moses brought them there just to die of thirst. God told Moses to strike the rock at Horeb to produce water, and they called the place Massah (trial) and Meribah (quarrel). The sixth open portion ends here.

In the continuation of the reading, Amalek attacked Israel at Rephidim. Moses stationed himself on the top of the hill, with the rod of God in his hand, and whenever Moses held up his hand, Israel prevailed; but whenever he let down his hand, Amalek prevailed. When Moses grew weary, he sat on a stone, while Aaron and Hur supported his hands, and Joshua overwhelmed Amalek in battle. The seventh open portion ends here.

In the maftir reading that concludes the parashah, God instructed Moses to inscribe a document as a reminder that God would utterly blot out the memory of Amalek. The seventh reading, the eighth open portion, and the parashah end here.

Readings according to the triennial cycle
Jews who read the Torah according to the triennial cycle of Torah reading read the parashah according to the following schedule:

In inner-biblical interpretation
The parashah has parallels or is discussed in these Biblical sources:

Exodus chapter 15

Exodus chapter 16
 refers to the Sabbath. Commentators note that the Hebrew Bible repeats the commandment to observe the Sabbath 12 times.

 reports that on the seventh day of Creation, God finished God's work, rested, and blessed and hallowed the seventh day.

The Sabbath is one of the Ten Commandments.  commands that one remember the Sabbath day, keep it holy, and not do any manner of work or cause anyone under one's control to work, for in six days God made heaven and earth and rested on the seventh day, blessed the Sabbath, and hallowed it.  commands that one observe the Sabbath day, keep it holy, and not do any manner of work or cause anyone under one's control to work—so that one's subordinates might also rest—and remember that the Israelites were servants in the land of Egypt, and God brought them out with a mighty hand and by an outstretched arm.

And God told Moses to let no one go out of one's place on the seventh day.

In , just before giving Moses the second Tablets of Stone, God commanded that the Israelites keep and observe the Sabbath throughout their generations, as a sign between God and the children of Israel forever, for in six days God made heaven and earth, and on the seventh day God rested.

In , just before issuing the instructions for the Tabernacle, Moses again told the Israelites that no one should work on the Sabbath, specifying that one must not kindle fire on the Sabbath.

In , God told Moses to repeat the Sabbath commandment to the people, calling the Sabbath a holy convocation.

The prophet Isaiah taught in  that iniquity is inconsistent with the Sabbath. In , the prophet taught that if people turn away from pursuing or speaking of business on the Sabbath and call the Sabbath a delight, then God will make them ride upon the high places of the earth and will feed them with the heritage of Jacob.

The prophet Jeremiah taught in  that the fate of Jerusalem depended on whether the people obstained from work on the Sabbath, refraining from carrying burdens outside their houses and through the city gates.

The prophet Ezekiel told in  how God gave the Israelites God's Sabbaths, to be a sign between God and them, but the Israelites rebelled against God by profaning the Sabbaths, provoking God to pour out God's fury upon them, but God stayed God's hand.

In , Nehemiah told how he saw some treading wine presses on the Sabbath, and others bringing all manner of burdens into Jerusalem on the Sabbath day, so when it began to be dark before the Sabbath, he commanded that the city gates be shut and not opened till after the Sabbath and directed the Levites to keep the gates to sanctify the Sabbath.

In early nonrabbinic interpretation
The parashah has parallels or is discussed in these early nonrabbinic sources:

 told how in the 2nd century BCE, many followers of the pious Jewish priest Mattathias rebelled against the Seleucid king Antiochus IV Epiphanes. Antiochus's soldiers attacked a group of them on the Sabbath, and when the Pietists failed to defend themselves so as to honor the Sabbath (commanded in, among other places), a thousand died.  reported that when Mattathias and his friends heard, they reasoned that if they did not fight on the Sabbath, they would soon be destroyed. So they decided that they would fight against anyone who attacked them on the Sabbath.

In classical rabbinic interpretation
The parashah is discussed in these rabbinic sources from the era of the Mishnah and the Talmud:

Exodus chapter 13

As the merchant's house was near the slaughterhouse, he thought to himself that he had better lead the new cow home by another route, for if he led the cow past the slaughterhouse and it saw the blood there, it might turn tail and flee. So God led them by another route.

Rabbi Jose ben Hanina taught that God did not lead the Israelites by the way of the land of the Philistines (as reported in ) because Abimelech's grandson was still alive, and God did not want the Israelites to violate Abraham's oath of  not to deal falsely with Abimelech, his son, or his grandson.

The Rabbis taught in a Baraita that on the days of the 8-day Passover holiday, Jews read the various passages in the Torah relating to Passover. Thus, on the seventh day of Passover, Jews read  and as haftarah .

The Midrash taught that God asked the Israelites whether when a mortal king went into the wilderness, the king found there the same ease, the same food, or the same drink that he enjoyed in his own palace. The Midrash taught that the Israelites, however, were slaves in Egypt, and God brought them out of there and caused them to recline on lordly couches. In support of this, the Midrash reread , "But God led the people about, (vayaseiv) by the way of the wilderness," reading , vayaseiv, to mean God caused them "to recline" (using the same root , svv) in the manner of kings reclining upon their couches.

The Mishnah cited  for the proposition that Providence treats a person measure for measure as that person treats others. And Moses, in turn, was so great that none but God attended him, as  reports that God buried Moses. Similarly, the Tosefta cited  for the proposition that as Joseph had the merit of burying Jacob, so it was that only Moses took the trouble to care for Joseph's bones. The Tosefta deduced from this that the rest of the Israelites were occupied with plunder, but Moses occupied himself with performing a commandment. When the Israelites saw Moses caring for Joseph's bones, they concluded that they should let Moses do so, so that Joseph's honor would be greater when his rites were taken care of by great people instead of unimportant people.

Citing , the Tosefta taught that just as "Moses took the bones of Joseph with him" into the Levites' camp, so one who was impure by reason of corpse contamination—and even a corpse—could enter the Temple Mount.

A Midrash illustrated a precept to finish what one starts by citing how Moses began performing a commandment by taking the bones of Joseph with him, as  reports, but failed to complete the task. Reading , "For this commandment that I command you this day . . . is very near to you, in your mouth, and in your heart," a Midrash interpreted "heart" and "mouth" to symbolize the beginning and end of fulfilling a precept and thus read  as an exhortation to complete a good deed once started. Thus Rabbi Hiyya bar Abba taught that if one begins a precept and does not complete it, the result will be that he will bury his wife and children. The Midrash cited as support for this proposition the experience of Judah, who began a precept and did not complete it. And had Judah called for Joseph's brothers to restore Joseph to their father, they would have listened to him then, as well. Thus because Judah began a precept (the good deed toward Joseph) and did not complete it, he buried his wife and two sons, as  reports, "Shua's daughter, the wife of Judah, died," and  further reports, "Er and Onan died in the land of Canaan." The Midrash illustrated this by citing how Moses began a precept by taking the bones of Joseph with him, as  reports, "And Moses took the bones of Joseph with him." But because Moses never brought Joseph's bones into the Land of Israel, the precept is attributed to the Israelites, who buried them, as  reports, "And the bones of Joseph, which the children of Israel brought up out of Egypt, they buried in Shechem."  does not say, "Which Moses brought up out of Egypt," but "Which the children of Israel brought up out of Egypt." And the Midrash explained that the reason that they buried Joseph's bones in Shechem could be compared to a case in which some thieves stole a cask of wine, and when the owner discovered them, the owner told them that after they had consumed the wine, they needed to return the cask to its proper place. So when the brothers sold Joseph, it was from Shechem that they sold him, as  reports, "And Israel said to Joseph: 'Do not your brothers feed the flock in Shechem?'" God told the brothers that since they had sold Joseph from Shechem, they needed to return Joseph's bones to Shechem.

The Gemara cited their doing so to support the law that one who is engaged on one religious duty is free from any other.

The Tosefta read , "the pillar of cloud by day, and the pillar of fire by night, departed not from before the people," to teach that the one who served by day completed the work of the one who served by night, and the one who served by night completed the work of the one who served by day. The Tosefta also taught that God gave the Israelites seven clouds in the wilderness—one on their right, one on their left, one before them, one, behind them, one over their heads, and one among them. And the seventh pillar of cloud went ahead of them and would kill snakes and scorpions; burn off thorns, brambles, and prickly bushes; and level down high places and raise up low places, making for them a straight path, as  says, "the ark of the covenant of the Lord went before them."

The Gemara told that Rav Joseph's wife used to kindle the Sabbath lights late (just before nightfall). So she thought of lighting the Sabbath lights very early. But an elder told her that one may kindle when one chooses, provided that one does not light too early (as it would not evidently honor the Sabbath) or too late (later than just before nightfall).

Exodus chapter 14
Reading , "I have declared, and I have saved, and I have announced," a Midrash taught that God "declared" to Egypt that the Israelites had fled, so that they would hear, pursue after them, and be drowned in the sea, as  reports, "And it was told the king of Egypt that the people had fled." God "saved," as  reports, "Thus the Lord saved Israel that day." And God "announced" to the rest of the world, as  says, "The peoples have heard, they tremble."

A Midrash taught that a slave's master wept when slaves escaped, while the slaves sang when they had thrown off bondage. So the Egyptians wept when the Israelites escaped (as  reports). The Israelites, however, chanted a song when they were released from bondage.

Reading , "And he made ready his chariot," to indicate that Pharaoh prepared his chariot personally, a Midrash remarked that surely, he had plenty of slaves who could have done so for him. The Midrash concluded that the intensity of Pharaoh's hate thus upset the natural order.

A Baraita in the Jerusalem Talmud noted that , "With three on all of them," reported chariots with three horses, while , "And he made him ride in his double chariot," reported chariots with two horses. The Baraita deduced that at first, though the time of Joseph, only two horses pulled chariots, but a later Pharaoh made chariots drawn by three horses. And the Baraita further reported that the Roman Empire made chariots drawn by four horses.

Rabban Gamaliel said that the Egyptians pursued after the Israelites as far as the Reed Sea, and encamped behind them. The enemy was behind them and the sea was in front of them. The Israelites saw the Egyptians, and became greatly afraid. The Israelites cast away all their Egyptian abominations, repented sincerely, and called upon God, as  reports, "And when Pharaoh drew near, the children of Israel lifted up their eyes." Moses saw the Israelites' anguish, and prayed on their behalf.

Rabbi Meir taught that when the Israelites stood by the sea, the tribes competed with each other over who would go into the sea first. The tribe of Benjamin went first, as  says: "There is Benjamin, the youngest, ruling them (rodem)," and Rabbi Meir read rodem, "ruling them," as rad yam, "descended into the sea." Then the princes of Judah threw stones at them, as  says: "the princes of Judah their council (rigmatam)," and Rabbi Meir read rigmatam as "stoned them." For that reason, Benjamin merited hosting the site of God's Temple, as  says: "He dwells between his shoulders." Rabbi Judah answered Rabbi Meir that in reality, no tribe was willing to be the first to go into the sea. I sink in deep mire, where there is no standing . . . . Let not the water overwhelm me, neither let the deep swallow me up." Moses asked God, "Lord of the Universe, what is there in my power to do?" And lift up your rod, and stretch out your hand over the sea, and divide it; and the children of Israel shall go into the midst of the sea on dry ground." Because of Nahshon's actions, Judah merited becoming the ruling power in Israel, as  says, "Judah became His sanctuary, Israel His dominion," and that happened because, as  says, "The sea saw [him], and fled."

Similarly, Rabbi Akiva said that the Israelites advanced to enter the Reed Sea, but they turned backwards, fearing that the waters would come over them. The tribe of Judah sanctified God's Name and entered the sea first, as  says, "Judah became his sanctuary (in order to sanctify God), Israel his dominion." The Egyptians wanted to follow the Israelites, but they turned back, fearing that the waters would return over them. God appeared before them like a man riding on the back of a mare, as it is said in Song of Songs , "To a steed in Pharaoh's chariots." Pharaoh's horse saw the mare of God, and it neighed and ran into the sea after it.

Reading , "And the Lord said to Moses: 'Why do you cry to Me? Speak to the children of Israel, that they go forward," Rabbi Eliezer taught that God was telling Moses that there is a time to pray briefly and a time to pray at length. God was telling Moses that God's children were in trouble, the sea cut them off, the enemy pursued, and yet Moses stood and said a long prayer! God told Moses that it was time to cut short his prayer and act.

For notwithstanding their fear, the Israelites had believed in God and followed Moses that far.

And they were made into walls of water between each path, and between each path were windows. The Israelites could see one another, and they saw God walking before them, but they did not see the heels of God's feet, as  says, "Your way was in the sea, and your paths in the great waters, and your footsteps were not known."

Rabbi Johanan taught that God does not rejoice in the downfall of the wicked. But God rebuked them: "The work of my hands is being drowned in the sea, and you want to sing songs?" Rabbi Eleazar replied that a close reading of  shows that God does not rejoice personally, but does make others rejoice.

Rabbi Eliezer said that a maidservant at the sea saw what Isaiah and Ezekiel and the prophets never saw.

The Midrash taught that the six days of darkness occurred in Egypt, while the seventh day of darkness was a day of darkness of the sea, as  says: "And there was the cloud and the darkness here, yet it gave light by night there." So God sent clouds and darkness and covered the Egyptians with darkness, but gave light to the Israelites, as God had done for them in Egypt. Hence  says: "The Lord is my light and my salvation." And the Midrash taught that in the Messianic Age, as well, God will bring darkness to sinners, but light to Israel, as  says: "For, behold, darkness shall cover the earth, and gross darkness the peoples; but upon you the Lord will shine."

The Pirke De-Rabbi Eliezer recounted that Moses cried out to God that the enemy was behind them and the sea in front of them, and asked which way they should go. So God sent the angel Michael, who became a wall of fire between the Israelites and the Egyptians. The Egyptians wanted to follow after the Israelites, but they are unable to come near because of the fire. The angels saw the Israelites' misfortune all the night, but they uttered neither praise nor sanctification, as  says, "And the one came not near the other all the night." God told Moses (as  reports) to "Stretch out your hand over the sea, and divide it." So (as  reports) "Moses stretched out his hand over the sea," but the sea refused to be divided. So God looked at the sea, and the waters saw God's Face, and they trembled and quaked, and descended into the depths, as  says, "The waters saw You, O God; the waters saw You, they were afraid: the depths also trembled." Rabbi Eliezer taught that on the day that God said , "Let the waters be gathered together," the waters congealed, and God made them into twelve valleys, corresponding to the twelve tribes, and they were made into walls of water between each path, and the Israelites could see each other, and they saw God, walking before them, but they did not see the heels of God's feet, as  says, "Your way was in the sea, and Your paths in the great waters, and Your footsteps were not known."

Rabbi Zerika asked about an apparent contradiction of Scriptural passages in the presence of Rabbi Eleazar, or, according to another version, he asked in the name of Rabbi Eleazar.  says: "And Moses entered into the midst of the cloud," whereas  reads: "And Moses was not able to enter into the tent of meeting because the cloud abode thereon." The Gemara concluded that this teaches us that God took hold of Moses and brought him into the cloud.

Rabbi Hama ben Hanina deduced from  that Pharaoh meant: "Come, let us outwit the Savior of Israel." The Egyptians failed to note that while God had sworn not to bring another flood on the whole world, God could still bring a flood on only one people. This all bore out what Rabbi Eleazar said: In the pot in which they cooked, they were themselves cooked—that is, with the punishment that the Egyptians intended for the Israelites, the Egyptians were themselves punished.

Rabbi Nehemiah, however, said that Pharaoh alone survived, teaching that  speaks of Pharaoh when it says, "But in very deed for this cause have I made you to stand." And some taught that later on Pharaoh went down and was drowned, as  says, "For the horses of Pharaoh went in with his chariots and with his horsemen into the sea."

Rabbi Simon said that on the fourth day, the Israelites encamped by the edge of the sea. The Egyptians were floating like skin-bottles upon the surface of the waters, and a north wind cast them opposite the Israelites' camp. The Israelites saw the Egyptians and recognized them, saying that these were officials of Pharaoh's palace, and those were taskmasters. The Israelites recognized every one, as  says, "And Israel saw the Egyptians dead upon the sea shore."

Exodus chapter 15
Rabbis in the Talmud gave differing explanations of how, as  reports, the Israelites sang the song of  along with Moses. Rabbi Akiva taught that Moses sang the entire song, and the Israelites respond after him with the leading word, as where an adult read the Hallel for a congregation and they responded after him with the leading word (or some say, with "Hallelujah"). According to this explanation, Moses sang, "I will sing to the Lord," and the Israelites responded, "I will sing to the Lord"; then Moses sang, "For He has triumphed gloriously," and the Israelites once again responded, "I will sing to the Lord." Rabbi Eliezer son of Rabbi Jose the Galilean taught that Moses sang the entire song, one verse at a time, and the Israelites respond after him by repeating the entire song, one verse at a time, as where a minor read the Hallel for a congregation and they repeated after the minor all that minor had said. According to this explanation, Moses sang, "I will sing to the Lord," and the Israelites responded, "I will sing to the Lord"; then Moses sang, "For He has triumphed gloriously," and the Israelites responded, "For He has triumphed gloriously." Rabbi Nehemiah taught that Moses sang the opening, the Israelites repeated the opening, and then Moses and the Israelites recited the balance together, as where a school-teacher recited the Shema in the Synagogue. The Gemara explained that each of the three interpreted  Rabbi Akiva held that the word "saying" in  refers to the first clause, "I will sing to the Lord," and that was the Israelites' only response. Rabbi Eliezer son of Rabbi Jose the Galilean held that "saying" refers to every clause of the song. And Rabbi Nehemiah held that "and spoke" indicates that they all sang together, and "saying" indicates that Moses began first.

Ben Avvai said that everything is judged according to the principle of measure for measure; just as the Egyptians were proud, and cast the male children into the river, so God cast the Egyptians into the sea, as  says, "I will sing to the Lord, for he has triumphed triumphantly; the horse and his rider has he thrown into the sea."

And as soon as the Israelites saw God, they recognized God, and they all sang, "This is my God, and I will glorify Him."

Thus, the Gemara taught that in God's honor, one should make a beautiful sukkah, a beautiful lulav, a beautiful shofar, beautiful tzitzit, and a beautiful Torah Scroll, and write it with fine ink, a fine reed pen, and a skilled penman, and wrap it about with beautiful silks. Thus, Abba Saul reasoned, we should seek to be like God. Just as God is gracious and compassionate, so should we be gracious and compassionate.

Rabbi Meir said that even fetuses in their mothers' wombs sang the song, as  says, "Bless the Lord in the Congregations, even the Lord, from the source of Israel." (And a person's "source" is the womb.) The Gemara asked how fetuses could see the Divine Presence. Rabbi Tanhum said that the abdomen of pregnant women became transparent and the fetuses saw.

The Tosefta deduced from  that the Egyptians took pride before God only on account of the water of the Nile, and thus God exacted punishment from them only by water when in  God cast Pharaoh's chariots and army into the Reed Sea.

(For in the face of Titus's blasphemy, God remained silent.)

A Midrash taught that as God created the four cardinal directions, so also did God set about God's throne four angels—Michael, Gabriel, Uriel, and Raphael—with Michael at God's right. The Midrash taught that Michael got his name (Mi-ka'el) as a reward for the manner in which he praised God in two expressions that Moses employed. The Midrash taught that mi combined with ka'el to form the name Mi ka'el.

Reading , the Pirke De-Rabbi Eliezer taught that the Israelites said to God that there is none like God among the ministering angels, and therefore all the angels' names contain part of a Name for God (Elohim). For example, the names Michael and Gabriel contain the word , El.

The Pirke De-Rabbi Eliezer taught that when in  the Israelites sang, "Who is like You among the divine creatures, O Lord?" Rabbi Nechunia, son of Hakkanah, thus cited Pharaoh as an example of the power of repentance. God thus delivered Pharaoh from the dead.

The Pirke De-Rabbi Eliezer noted that  does not employ the words "fearful in praise," but "fearful in praises." For the ministering angels sing praises on high, and Israel sings praises on earth below. Thus  says, "fearful in praises, doing wonders," and  says, "You are holy, O You Who inhabit the praises of Israel."

Rabbi Judah ben Simon compared Israel to a king's son who went into the marketplace and struck people but was not struck in return (because of his being the king's son). He insulted but was not insulted. He went up to his father arrogantly. But the father asked the son whether he thought that he was respected on his own account, when the son was respected only on account of the respect that was due to the father. So the father renounced the son, and as a result, no one took any notice of him. So when Israel went out of Egypt, the fear of them fell upon all the nations, as  reported, "The peoples have heard, they tremble; pangs have taken hold on the inhabitants of Philistia. Then were the chiefs of Edom frightened; the mighty men of Moab, trembling takes hold upon them; all the inhabitants of Canaan are melted away. Terror and dread falls upon them." But when Israel transgressed and sinned, God asked Israel whether it thought that it was respected on its own account, when it was respected only on account of the respect that was due to God. So God turned away from them a little, and the Amalekites came and attacked Israel, as  reports, "Then Amalek came, and fought with Israel in Rephidim," and then the Canaanites came and fought with Israel, as  reports, "And the Canaanite, the king of Arad, who dwelt in the South, heard tell that Israel came by the way of Atharim; and he fought against Israel." God told the Israelites that they had no genuine faith, as  says, "they are a very disobedient generation, children in whom is no faith." God concluded that the Israelites were rebellious, but to destroy them was impossible, to take them back to Egypt was impossible, and God could not change them for another people. So God concluded to chastise and try them with suffering.

And the words, "till Your people pass over, O Lord," in  allude to the first advance of the Israelites into the Promised Land in the days of Joshua. And the words, "till the people pass over whom You have gotten," in  allude to the second advance of the Israelites into the Promised Land in the days of Ezra. The Baraita thus concluded that the Israelites were worthy that God should perform a miracle on their behalf during the second advance as in the first advance, but that did not happen because the Israelites' sin caused God to withhold the miracle.

The Gemara counted , "The Lord shall reign for ever and ever," among only three verses in the Torah that indisputably refer to God's Kingship, and thus are suitable for recitation on Rosh Hashanah.

The Gemara cited these proofs: Using , nezach,  says, "For I will not contend for ever, neither will I be always (nezach) angry." Using , selah,  says, "As we have heard, so have we seen in the city of the Lord of hosts, in the city of our God—God establish it forever. Selah." Using , va'ed,  says, "The Lord shall reign for ever and ever (l'olam va'ed)."

The Sages taught in a Baraita in the Babylonian Talmud that seven prophetesses prophesied on behalf of the Jewish people. The Gemara identified them as Sarah, Miriam, Deborah, Hannah, Abigail, Huldah, and Esther. The Gemara explained that Miriam was a prophetess, as  says: “And Miriam the prophetess, the sister of Aaron, took a timbrel in her hand.” The Gemara asked why this verse mentions only Aaron and not Moses. Rav Naḥman said that Rav said that she prophesied when she was only Aaron's sister, before Moses was born, saying that her mother was destined to bear a son who would deliver the Jewish people to salvation. When Moses was born, the entire house was filled with light, and her father stood and kissed her on the head and told her that her prophecy had been fulfilled. But when Moses was cast into the river, her father patted her on the head, asking what had become of her prophecy, as it looked as though Moses would soon die. That is why  reports: “And his sister stood at a distance to know what would be done to him,” for Miriam wanted to know how her prophecy would be fulfilled. The Mekhilta reported that Miriam had told her father that he was destined to have a son who would save Israel from the hands of the Egyptians.

But Rabbi Akiva warned that one who whispered  as an incantation over a wound to heal it would have no place in the world to come.

The Gemara deduced from  that Torah study keeps away painful sufferings. He argued that the word , uf, refers only to the Torah, as  says, "Will you close (hataif) your eyes to it (the Torah)? It is gone." And , reshef, refers only to painful sufferings, as  says, "The wasting of hunger, and the devouring of the fiery bolt (reshef). Rabbi Johanan said to Rabbi Shimon ben Lakish that even school children know that the Torah protects against painful disease. For  says, "And He said: 'If you will diligently hearken to the voice of the Lord your God, and will do that which is right in His eyes, and will give ear to His commandments, and keep all His statutes, I will put none of the diseases upon you that I have put upon the Egyptians; for I am the Lord Who heals you." Rather one should say that God visits those who have the opportunity to study the Torah and do not do so with ugly and painful sufferings which stir them up. For  says, "I was dumb with silence, I kept silence from the good thing, and my pain was stirred up." "The good thing" refers only to the Torah, as  says, "For I give you good doctrine; forsake not My teaching."

Exodus chapter 16
The Gemara concluded that the manna fell in different forms for different classes of people: For the righteous, it fell as bread; for average folk, it fell as cakes that required baking; and for the wicked, it fell as kernels that required grinding. Rabbi Jose ben Hanina said that the manna tasted differently for different classes of people: It tasted like honey for infants, bread for youths, and oil for the aged.

The Mishnah taught that the manna that  reports came down to the Israelites was among 10 miraculous things that God created on Sabbath eve at twilight on the first Friday at the completion of the Creation of the world.

Rabbi Simeon ben Lakish (Resh Lakish) identified them with Dathan and Abiram, reasoning that  uses the word "men" to refer to Dathan and Abiram, and thus the word "men" in  must also refer to them.

Answering in the negative, the Midrash taught that God wished to reveal to people the deeds of those who disobeyed and saved the manna, so God caused many worms to breed during that night so that the sinners should not be able to smell the staleness of the manna in the evening and throw it out. The Midrash told that Moses became so angry with them that he forgot to tell them to gather two omers for each person on the sixth day. So when they went out and gathered on the sixth day and found a double portion, the princes told Moses, as  reports, "And all the rulers of the congregation came and told Moses." The Midrash noted that Moses told them (in ), "This is that which the Lord has spoken," not "which I have spoken," because Moses had forgotten.

The Midrash explained that God told them that when nonbelievers would come and question why the Israelites kept the Sabbath on the day that they did, the Israelites could tell the nonbelievers, "See, the manna does not descend on the Sabbath."

The Alphabet of Rabbi Akiva taught that when God was giving Israel the Torah, God told them that if they accepted the Torah and observed God's commandments, then God would give them for eternity a most precious thing that God possessed—the World To Come. When Israel asked to see in this world an example of the World To Come, God replied that the Sabbath is an example of the World To Come.

A Midrash asked to which commandment  refers when it says, "For if you shall diligently keep all this commandment that I command you, to do it, to love the Lord your God, to walk in all His ways, and to cleave to Him, then will the Lord drive out all these nations from before you, and you shall dispossess nations greater and mightier than yourselves." Rabbi Levi said that "this commandment" refers to the recitation of the Shema, but the Rabbis said that it refers to the Sabbath, which is equal to all the precepts of the Torah.

Exodus chapter 17

In the Mekhilta of Rabbi Ishmael, Rabbi Eliezer said that the Israelites at Massah said that if God satisfied their needs, they would serve God, but if not, they would not serve God. Thus,  reports their "trying the Lord, saying: 'Is the Lord in our midst or not?'"

The Mishnah reported that in synagogues at Purim, Jews read .

The Mishnah quoted , which described how when Moses held up his hand, Israel prevailed, and asked whether Moses' hands really made war or stopped it. Rather, the Mishnah read the verse to teach that as long as the Israelites looked upward and submitted their hearts to God, they would grow stronger, but when they did not, they would fall. The Mishnah taught that the fiery serpent placed on a pole in  worked much the same way, by directing the Israelites to look upward to God.

In medieval Jewish interpretation
The parashah is discussed in these medieval Jewish sources:

Exodus chapter 14
The offender would thus be prevented from doing repentance, and would not have the power to return from the offense, and the offender would die and be lost because of the offense. Similarly  reports, "They ridiculed the messengers of God, disdained His words and insulted His prophets until the anger of God rose upon the people, without possibility of healing." Maimonides interpreted these verses to teach that they sinned willingly and to such an egregious extent that they deserved to have repentance withheld from them. Maimonides explained that God sent Moses to tell Pharaoh to send out the Jews and do repentance, when God had already told Moses that Pharaoh would refuse, because God sought to inform humanity that when God withholds repentance from a sinner, the sinner will not be able to repent. Maimonides made clear that God did not decree that Pharaoh harm the Jewish people; rather, Pharaoh sinned willfully on his own, and he thus deserved to have the privilege of repentance withheld from him.

Baḥya ibn Paquda argued that the greatest benefit that God bestowed on humanity and the strongest proof of God's existence is the Torah that God gave humanity and God's manifestation of God's presence, as  says, "And Israel saw the great work which the Lord wrought upon the Egyptians, and the people: feared the Lord, and they believed in the Lord and in Moses, His servant."

Exodus chapter 15
Baḥya ibn Paquda cited  for the proposition that the relation of nature to the Torah is that of a servant to a master, and the forces of nature operate in harmony with the teaching of the Torah.

Exodus chapter 16
Baḥya ibn Paquda taught that the proper way for those who trust in God, when their livelihood is withheld, is to say in their hearts: "The God who took me out from the womb to this world at a particular moment, and did not take me out earlier or later, is the One who is withholding my livelihood until a fixed time, because God knows what is good for me." Similarly, when their livelihood comes in only what they need for basic food, it is proper for them to tell themselves: "The God who prepared my sustenance at my mother's breast, in my beginning, according to my need, and what was sufficient for me day by day, until God replaced it for me with something better, and the milk's coming exactly did not damage me at all, so too I will not be damaged now at all, by God's sending me my food in this limited amount, until the end of my days.

Exodus chapter 17
So Abravanel asked why  should term this conduct of theirs "trying," as it appeared to be an absolutely legitimate and essential request.

In modern interpretation
The parashah is discussed in these modern sources:

Exodus chapter 13
Moshe Greenberg wrote that one may see the entire Exodus story as "the movement of the fiery manifestation of the divine presence."

Exodus chapter 14
Noting that  addresses the Pharaoh as a "mighty monster," thus associating him with the primeval sea monster that  reports God defeated in establishing order and creating the world, Rabbi Shai Held of Yeshivat Hadar argued that the Bible thematically associates Pharaoh with the forces of chaos, and thus that God's vanquishing Pharaoh at the sea in  reenacts God's primordial victory over the sea monster and chaos in creating the world.

Everett Fox noted that "glory" (kevod) and "stubbornness" (kaved lev) are leading words throughout the book of Exodus that give it a sense of unity.

In his digest of Christopher Columbus's log from Columbus's first voyage, Bartolomé de las Casas reported that on Sunday, September 23, 1492, the sea was calm and smooth, causing the crew to grumble, saying that since there were no heavy seas in those parts, no wind would ever carry them back to Spain. But later, to their astonishment, the seas rose high without any wind.

In a March 1776 sermon, Massachusetts minister
Elijah Fitch likened the British King George III to "that proud and haughty Monarch Pharaoh, king of Egypt." Fitch argued that God appeared to aid the Israelites when they shook off the yoke of Egyptian bondage, and Pharaoh and his host pursued them and seemed to leave them no way of escape, and so God would aid the colonists. Fitch said that God permits the wicked to accomplish some of their evil purposes against the just, but in the end frustrates them. And "thus was it with proud Pharaoh, he was lifted up on high, with sure expectations of destroying the Israelites and dividing the spoil, flushed with the hopes of certain success, he rushes forward, till his glory, his pomp and his multitude are altogether buried in the sea."

Similarly, the Massachusetts minister Phillips Payson preached of the American Revolution that "the finger of God has indeed been so conspicuous in every stage of our glorious struggle, that it seems as if the wonders and miracles performed for Israel of old, were repeated anew for the American Israel, in our day." Payson also likened George III to pharaoh, saying: "The hardness that possessed the heart of Pharaoh of old, seems to have calloused the heart of the British King; and the madness that drove that ancient tyrant and his hosts into the sea, appears to have possessed the British court and councils."

The 19th century pre-Civil War African-American spiritual "Mary Don't You Weep" employed the image of Moses at the shore of the sea and the liberation of the Israelites in the context of slavery in the United States.

Moses Mendelssohn read the report of  that "the Israelites saw and trusted in the Eternal and in Moses, his servant" along with the report of  that "Abraham trusted in the Eternal" to demonstrate that the word often translated as "faith" actually means, in most cases, "trust," "confidence," and "firm reliance." Thus Mendelssohn concluded that Scripture does not command faith, but accepts no other commands than those that come by way of conviction. Its propositions are presented to the understanding, submitted for consideration, without being forced upon our belief. Belief and doubt, assent and opposition, in Mendelssohn's view, are not determined by desire, wishes, longings, fear, or hope, but by knowledge of truth and untruth. Hence, Mendelssohn concluded, ancient Judaism has no articles of faith.

Exodus chapter 15
James Kugel wrote that scholars have established that Semitic languages did not originally have a definite article (corresponding to the word "the" in English), but later developed one (the prefix , ha, in Hebrew). That the song of  does not contain even one definite article indicated to Kugel (along with other ancient morphological and lexical features) that "it has been preserved from a very early stage of the Hebrew language and thus may be one of the oldest parts of the Bible."

Similarly, Robert A. Oden called  "almost certainly the oldest single extended poem in the Hebrew Bible," describing "the parade holy war events, the Exodus from Egypt and the conquest of the land of Canaan."

Similarly, Propp considered it likely that the Song of the Sea originally circulated independently and should thus be considered another source.

A: The introduction announces the core theme. (.)
B: The first core element, a victory song (.)
C: A doxology affirms God's distinctiveness. (.)
B1: The second core element, a triumphal procession of the Victor to the throne. (.)
A1: The conclusion, an enthronement formula anticipating God's reign (.)

In , "Who is like you among the gods, O Lord?" John J. Collins found continuity with the Mesopotamian view of divinity that freely granted the reality of other gods.

Exodus chapter 16
In 1950, the Committee on Jewish Law and Standards of Conservative Judaism ruled: "Refraining from the use of a motor vehicle is an important aid in the maintenance of the Sabbath spirit of repose. Such restraint aids, moreover, in keeping the members of the family together on the Sabbath. However where a family resides beyond reasonable walking distance from the synagogue, the use of a motor vehicle for the purpose of synagogue attendance shall in no way be construed as a violation of the Sabbath but, on the contrary, such attendance shall be deemed an expression of loyalty to our faith. . . . [I]n the spirit of a living and developing Halachah responsive to the changing needs of our people, we declare it to be permitted to use electric lights on the Sabbath for the purpose of enhancing the enjoyment of the Sabbath, or reducing personal discomfort in the performance of a mitzvah."

Baruch Spinoza taught that religion only acquires the force of law by means of a sovereign power. Therefore, Moses was not able to punish those who, before the covenant, and consequently while still in possession of their rights, violated the Sabbath (in ). However, Moses was able to do so after the covenant (in ), because all the Israelites had then yielded up their natural rights, and the ordinance of the Sabbath had received the force of law.

Exodus chapter 17

Nehama Leibowitz argued that the sin with which the Israelites were charged at Massah was that of trying to find out whether belief in God was worthwhile. Leibowitz said that the Israelites did not really need to ask if God was among them or not, for surely they had by then plainly benefitted from God's kindnesses on more than one occasion.

Commandments
According to Maimonides and Sefer ha-Chinuch, there is one negative commandment in the parashah:

Not to walk outside permitted limits on the Sabbath.

In the liturgy

The Passover Haggadah, in the magid section of the Seder, recounts the reasoning of Rabbi Jose the Galilean that as the phrase "the finger of God" in  referred to 10 plagues, "the great hand" (translated "the great work") in  must refer to 50 plagues upon the Egyptians.

The Song of the Sea, appears in its entirety in the P'sukei D'zimra section of the morning service for Shabbat

And the statement of God's eternal sovereignty in  also appears verbatim in the Kedushah D'Sidra section of the Minchah service for Shabbat.

The Weekly Maqam
In the Weekly Maqam, Sephardi Jews each week base the songs of the services on the content of that week's parashah. For Parashat Beshalach, Sephardi Jews apply Maqam Ajam, which commemorates the joy and song of the Israelites as they crossed the sea.

Haftarah
The haftarah for the parashah is:
for Ashkenazi Jews: ; and
for Sephardi Jews: .
For Ashkenazi Jews, the haftarah is the longest of the year.

Both the parashah and the haftarah contain songs that celebrate the victory of God's people, the parashah in the "Song of the Sea" about God's deliverance of the Israelites from Pharaoh, and the haftarah in the "Song of Deborah" about the Israelites' victory over the Canaanite general Sisera. Both the parashah and the haftarah report how the leaders of Israel's enemies assembled hundreds of chariots. Both the parashah and the haftarah report how God "threw . . . into panic" (va-yaham) Israel's enemies. Both the parashah and the haftarah report waters sweeping away Israel's enemies. Both the parashah and the haftarah report singing by women to celebrate, the parashah by Miriam, and the haftarah by Deborah. Finally, both the parashah and the haftarah mention Amalek.

The Gemara tied together God's actions in the parashah and the haftarah. To reassure Israelites concerned that their enemies still lived, God had the Reed Sea spit out the dead Egyptians. To repay the seas, God committed the Kishon River to deliver one-and-a-half times as many bodies. To pay the debt, when Sisera came to attack the Israelites, God had the Kishon wash the Canaanites away.

Notes

Further reading
The parashah has parallels or is discussed in these sources:

Biblical
 (God separated water to reveal dry land);  (Amalekites);  (Amalek);  (Amalek);  (Joseph's bones).
 (pillar of fire).
 (hardening of heart);  (hardening of heart);  (Amalekites).
 (crossing waters);  (crossing waters);  (hardening of heart);  (Joseph's bones).
 (keeping the Sabbath);  (universally observed Sabbath).
 (God blots out the names of enemies);  (God as "the Rock," generation of the Wilderness);  (God's power over the sea);  (God's eternal sovereignty).
 (Agagite, read as Amalekite via ).
, 19 (pillar of fire).

Early nonrabbinic
Ezekiel the Tragedian. Exagōgē. 2nd century BCE. Translated by R.G. Robertson. In The Old Testament Pseudepigrapha: Volume 2: Expansions of the "Old Testament" and Legends, Wisdom and Philosophical Literature, Prayers, Psalms, and Odes, Fragments of Lost Judeo-Hellenistic works. Edited by James H. Charlesworth, pages 816–19. New York: Anchor Bible, 1985.
Romans  1st century. (hardening Pharaoh's heart).
Hebrews  (Joseph's bones);  (first Passover). Late 1st century.
 Late 1st century. (changing hearts to God's purpose).
Josephus. Antiquities of the Jews 2:14:5 –3:2:5 . Circa 93–94. In, e.g., The Works of Josephus: Complete and Unabridged, New Updated Edition. Translated by William Whiston, pages 74–83. Peabody, Massachusetts: Hendrickson Publishers, 1987.
Acts  2nd century. (Joseph's bones).

Classical rabbinic
Mishnah: Shabbat 1:1–24:5; Eruvin 1:1–10:15; Rosh Hashanah 3:8; Megillah 3:6; Sotah 1:7–9; Sanhedrin 10:1; Avot 5:6. 3rd century. In, e.g., The Mishnah: A New Translation. Translated by Jacob Neusner, pages 208–29; 304, 321, 449, 604, 686. New Haven: Yale University Press, 1988.
Tosefta: Shabbat 1:1–17:29; Eruvin 1:1–8:24; Sotah 3:13; 4:2, 7; 6:3; 8:7; 11:2; 15:2; Sanhedrin 12:10; Eduyot 1:1; Kelim Kamma 1:8. Land of Israel, circa 250 CE. In, e.g., The Tosefta: Translated from the Hebrew, with a New Introduction. Translated by Jacob Neusner, volume 1, pages 357–470, 841, 845–46, 855, 870, 878, 890; volume 2, pages 1187, 1245, 1577. Peabody, Massachusetts: Hendrickson Publishers, 2002.
Mekhilta of Rabbi Ishmael: 19:1–46:2. Land of Israel, late 4th century. In, e.g., Mekhilta According to Rabbi Ishmael. Translated by Jacob Neusner, volume 1, pages 125–72; volume 2, pages 1–36. Atlanta: Scholars Press, 1988.
Jerusalem Talmud: Berakhot 4b, 24a, 43b, 51a, 94b; Peah 5a, 9b; Kilayim 72b; Terumot 7a; Shabbat 1a–113b; Eruvin 1a–71a; Pesachim 32a, 47b; Shekalim 2b; Sukkah 28b; Beitzah 19a; Rosh Hashanah 21b; Taanit 3b, 12a; Megillah 2a, 8a, 25a, 32a; Ketubot 30a; Nedarim 12b; Sotah 8b, 27b; Sanhedrin 60b; Avodah Zarah 14b. Tiberias, Land of Israel, circa 400 C.E. In, e.g., Talmud Yerushalmi. Edited by Chaim Malinowitz, Yisroel Simcha Schorr, and Mordechai Marcus, volumes 1–3, 5, 7, 13, 16–19, 20, 22–26, 31, 33, 36, 45, 47. Brooklyn: Mesorah Publications, 2005–2020. And in, e.g., The Jerusalem Talmud: A Translation and Commentary. Edited by Jacob Neusner and translated by Jacob Neusner, Tzvee Zahavy, B. Barry Levy, and Edward Goldman. Peabody, Massachusetts: Hendrickson Publishers, 2009.
Mekhilta of Rabbi Simeon 2:2; 11:1; 15:4; 19:4–45:1; 48:2; 49:2; 50:2; 54:2; 61:2; 81:1. Land of Israel, 5th century. In, e.g., Mekhilta de-Rabbi Shimon bar Yohai. Translated by W. David Nelson, pages 7, 33, 50, 79–195, 214, 217, 228, 249, 279, 370. Philadelphia: Jewish Publication Society, 2006.

Babylonian Talmud: Berakhot 4a, 5a, 20b, 27a, 33a, 39b–40a, 54a–b, 58a; Shabbat 2a, 23b, 28a, 87b, 103b, 114b, 118b, 133b; Eruvin 2a–105a; Pesachim 47b, 67a, 85b, 87b, 117a, 118b; Yoma 4b, 52b, 70a, 75a–b; Sukkah 11b, 25a, 33a; Beitzah 2b, 15b; Rosh Hashanah 29a, 31a, 32b; Taanit 9a, 11a; Megillah 7a, 10b, 14a, 18a, 30b–31a; Moed Katan 25b; Chagigah 5b, 13b–14a; Yevamot 13b, 72a; Ketubot 5a, 7b, 62b; Nedarim 2b; Nazir 2b, 45a; Sotah 9b, 11a–b, 13b, 20b, 27b, 30b, 37a, 42b, 48a; Gittin 20a, 56b; Kiddushin 32a, 38a; Bava Kamma 82a, 92a–b; Bava Metzia 86b; Bava Batra 16b, 98a; Sanhedrin 11a–b, 17a, 20b, 39b, 42a, 56b, 90a, 91b–92a, 93a, 95b, 96b, 98b, 99b, 101a, 106a, 110a; Makkot 8b; Shevuot 15a; Avodah Zarah 2b, 4a, 11a, 24b; Horayot 8b, 12a; Menachot 27a, 31b, 32b, 53a–b, 95a; Chullin 14a, 89a, 135b; Arakhin 15a–b; Keritot 5b. Sasanian Empire, 6th century. In, e.g., Talmud Bavli. Edited by Yisroel Simcha Schorr, Chaim Malinowitz, and Mordechai Marcus, 72 volumes. Brooklyn: Mesorah Pubs., 2006.

Medieval
Exodus Rabbah 20:1–26:3. 10th century. In, e.g., Midrash Rabbah: Exodus. Translated by Simon M. Lehrman, volume 3. London: Soncino Press, 1939.
Rashi. Commentary. Exodus 13–17. Troyes, France, late 11th century. In, e.g., Rashi. The Torah: With Rashi's Commentary Translated, Annotated, and Elucidated. Translated and annotated by Yisrael Isser Zvi Herczeg, volume 2, pages 143–204. Brooklyn: Mesorah Publications, 1994.

Rashbam. Commentary on the Torah. Troyes, early 12th century. In, e.g., Rashbam's Commentary on Exodus: An Annotated Translation. Edited and translated by Martin I. Lockshin, pages 133–87. Atlanta: Scholars Press, 1997.
Judah Halevi. Kuzari. 1:85–86; 3:35; 4:3. Toledo, Spain, 1130–1140. In, e.g., Jehuda Halevi. Kuzari: An Argument for the Faith of Israel. Introduction by Henry Slonimsky, pages 60, 167, 202–03. New York: Schocken, 1964.
Abraham ibn Ezra. Commentary on the Torah. France, 1153. In, e.g., Ibn Ezra's Commentary on the Pentateuch: Exodus (Shemot). Translated and annotated by H. Norman Strickman and Arthur M. Silver, volume 2, pages 266–341. New York: Menorah Publishing Company, 1996.
Maimonides. Mishneh Torah: Hilchot Teshuvah, chapter 3, paragraph 3. Egypt. Circa 1170–1180. In, e.g., Mishneh Torah: Hilchot Teshuvah: The Laws of Repentance. Translated by Eliyahu Touger, pages 140–48. New York: Moznaim Publishing, 1990.

Maimonides. The Eight Chapters on Ethics, chapter 8. Egypt. Late 12th century. In, e.g., The Eight Chapters of Maimonides on Ethics (Shemonah Perakim): A Psychological and Ethical Treatise. Edited, annotated, and translated, with an introduction by Joseph I. Gorfinkle, pages 95–96. New York: Columbia University Press, 1912. Reprinted by Forgotten Books, 2012.
Maimonides. The Guide for the Perplexed. Cairo, Egypt, 1190. In, e.g., Moses Maimonides. The Guide for the Perplexed. Translated by Michael Friedländer, pages 18, 21, 26, 28, 30–31, 37, 58, 61, 107, 203, 210, 213, 271, 305, 324, 326, 339, 349, 383. New York: Dover Publications, 1956.

Hezekiah ben Manoah. Hizkuni. France, circa 1240. In, e.g., Chizkiyahu ben Manoach. Chizkuni: Torah Commentary. Translated and annotated by Eliyahu Munk, volume 2, pages 442–77. Jerusalem: Ktav Publishers, 2013.
Nachmanides. Commentary on the Torah. Jerusalem, circa 1270. In, e.g., Ramban (Nachmanides): Commentary on the Torah. Translated by Charles B. Chavel, volume 2, pages 176–248. New York: Shilo Publishing House, 1973.

Zohar 2:44a–67a. Spain, late 13th century. In, e.g., The Zohar. Translated by Harry Sperling and Maurice Simon. 5 volumes. London: Soncino Press, 1934.
Bahya ben Asher. Commentary on the Torah. Spain, early 14th century. In, e.g., Midrash Rabbeinu Bachya: Torah Commentary by Rabbi Bachya ben Asher. Translated and annotated by Eliyahu Munk, volume 3, pages 921–1022. Jerusalem: Lambda Publishers, 2003.
Jacob ben Asher (Baal Ha-Turim). Commentary on the Torah. Early 14th century. In, e.g., Baal Haturim Chumash: Shemos/Exodus. Translated by Eliyahu Touger; edited and annotated by Avie Gold, volume 2, pages 653–711. Brooklyn: Mesorah Publications, 2000.
Isaac ben Moses Arama. Akedat Yizhak (The Binding of Isaac). Late 15th century. In, e.g., Yitzchak Arama. Akeydat Yitzchak: Commentary of Rabbi Yitzchak Arama on the Torah. Translated and condensed by Eliyahu Munk, volume 1, pages 367–94. New York, Lambda Publishers, 2001.

Modern
Isaac Abravanel. Commentary on the Torah. Italy, between 1492 and 1509. In, e.g., Abarbanel: Selected Commentaries on the Torah: Volume 2: Shemos/Exodus. Translated and annotated by Israel Lazar, pages 173–219. Brooklyn: CreateSpace, 2015.
Abraham Saba. Ẓeror ha-Mor (Bundle of Myrrh). Fez, Morocco, circa 1500. In, e.g., Tzror Hamor: Torah Commentary by Rabbi Avraham Sabba. Translated and annotated by Eliyahu Munk, volume 3, pages 968–1019. Jerusalem, Lambda Publishers, 2008.
Obadiah ben Jacob Sforno. Commentary on the Torah. Venice, 1567. In, e.g., Sforno: Commentary on the Torah. Translation and explanatory notes by Raphael Pelcovitz, pages 346–71. Brooklyn: Mesorah Publications, 1997.
Moshe Alshich. Commentary on the Torah. Safed, circa 1593. In, e.g., Moshe Alshich. Midrash of Rabbi Moshe Alshich on the Torah. Translated and annotated by Eliyahu Munk, volume 2, pages 429–69. New York, Lambda Publishers, 2000.
Shlomo Ephraim Luntschitz. Kli Yakar. Lublin, 1602. In, e.g., Kli Yakar: Shemos. Translated by Elihu Levine, volume 1, pages 195–256. Southfield, Michigan: Targum Press/Feldheim Publishers, 2002.

Avraham Yehoshua Heschel. Commentaries on the Torah. Cracow, Poland, mid 17th century. Compiled as Chanukat HaTorah. Edited by Chanoch Henoch Erzohn. Piotrkow, Poland, 1900. In Avraham Yehoshua Heschel. Chanukas HaTorah: Mystical Insights of Rav Avraham Yehoshua Heschel on Chumash. Translated by Avraham Peretz Friedman, pages 142–59. Southfield, Michigan: Targum Press/Feldheim Publishers, 2004.
Thomas Hobbes. Leviathan, 3:34, 36. England, 1651. Reprint edited by C. B. Macpherson, pages 437, 457. Harmondsworth, England: Penguin Classics, 1982.
Chaim ibn Attar. Ohr ha-Chaim. Venice, 1742. In Chayim ben Attar. Or Hachayim: Commentary on the Torah. Translated by Eliyahu Munk, volume 2, pages 573–623. Brooklyn: Lambda Publishers, 1999.
Moses Mendelssohn. Sefer Netivot Hashalom (The "Bi'ur," The Explanation). Berlin, 1780–1783. In Moses Mendelssohn: Writings on Judaism, Christianity, and the Bible. Edited Michah Gottlieb, pages 211–15. Waltham, Massachusetts: Brandeis University Press, 2011.
Moses Mendelssohn. Jerusalem, § 2. Berlin, 1783. In Jerusalem: Or on Religious Power and Judaism. Translated by Allan Arkush; introduction and commentary by Alexander Altmann, page 100. Hanover, New Hampshire: Brandeis University Press, 1983.
Nachman of Breslov. Teachings. Bratslav, Ukraine, before 1811. In Rebbe Nachman's Torah: Breslov Insights into the Weekly Torah Reading: Exodus-Leviticus. Compiled by Chaim Kramer; edited by Y. Hall, pages 96–139. Jerusalem: Breslov Research Institute, 2011.
Henry Wadsworth Longfellow The Jewish Cemetery at Newport . Boston, 1854. In Harold Bloom. American Religious Poems, pages 80–81. New York: Library of America, 2006.
"Mary Don't You Weep." United States, 19th Century.
David Einhorn. "War with Amalek." Philadelphia, 1864. In American Sermons: The Pilgrims to Martin Luther King Jr. Edited by Michael Warner, pages 665–73. New York: Library of America, 1999.

Shlomo Ganzfried. Kitzur Shulchon Oruch, 90:3. Hungary, 1864. Translated by Eliyahu Touger, volume 1, pages 387–88. New York: Moznaim Publishing Corp., 1991.
Samson Raphael Hirsch. The Pentateuch: Exodus. Translated by Isaac Levy, volume 2, pages 174–235. Gateshead: Judaica Press, 2nd edition 1999. Originally published as Der Pentateuch uebersetzt und erklaert. Frankfurt, 1867–1878.

Samuel David Luzzatto (Shadal). Commentary on the Torah. Padua, 1871. In, e.g., Samuel David Luzzatto. Torah Commentary. Translated and annotated by Eliyahu Munk, volume 2, pages 634–96. New York: Lambda Publishers, 2012.
Emily Dickinson. Poem 1642 ("Red Sea," indeed! Talk not to me). Circa 1885. In The Complete Poems of Emily Dickinson. Edited by Thomas H. Johnson, page 673. New York: Little, Brown & Company, 1960.
Samson Raphael Hirsch. The Jewish Sabbath. Frankfurt, before 1889. Translated by Ben Josephussoro. 1911. Reprinted Lexington, Kentucky: CreateSpace Independent Publishing Platform, 2014.
Yehudah Aryeh Leib Alter. Sefat Emet. Góra Kalwaria (Ger), Poland, before 1906. Excerpted in The Language of Truth: The Torah Commentary of Sefat Emet. Translated and interpreted by Arthur Green, pages 99–104. Philadelphia: Jewish Publication Society, 1998. Reprinted 2012.
Franklin E. Hoskins. "The Route Over Which Moses Led the Children of Israel Out of Egypt." National Geographic. (December 1909): pages 1011–38.

Hermann Cohen. Religion of Reason: Out of the Sources of Judaism. Translated with an introduction by Simon Kaplan; introductory essays by Leo Strauss, page 328. New York: Ungar, 1972. Reprinted Atlanta: Scholars Press, 1995. Originally published as Religion der Vernunft aus den Quellen des Judentums. Leipzig: Gustav Fock, 1919.

James Joyce. Ulysses, chapter 7 (Aeolus). Paris: Shakespeare and Company, 1922. Reprinted, e.g., Ulysses: The Corrected Text. Edited by Hans Walter Gabler with Wolfhard Steppe and Claus Melchior, pages 116–17. New York: Random House, 1986.
Maynard Owen Williams. "East of Suez to the Mount of the Decalogue: Following the Trail Over Which Moses Led the Israelites from the Slave-Pens of Egypt to Sinai." National Geographic. (December 1927): pages 708–43.
Alexander Alan Steinbach. Sabbath Queen: Fifty-four Bible Talks to the Young Based on Each Portion of the Pentateuch, pages 48–51. New York: Behrman's Jewish Book House, 1936.

Abraham Isaac Kook. The Moral Principles. Early 20th century. In Abraham Isaac Kook: the Lights of Penitence, the Moral Principles, Lights of Holiness, Essays, Letters, and Poems. Translated by Ben Zion Bokser, pages 137, 146. Mahwah, New Jersey: Paulist Press 1978.
Benno Jacob. The Second Book of the Bible: Exodus. London, 1940. Translated by Walter Jacob, pages 376–493. Hoboken, New Jersey: KTAV Publishing House, 1992.
Thomas Mann. Joseph and His Brothers. Translated by John E. Woods, pages 577, 788. New York: Alfred A. Knopf, 2005. Originally published as Joseph und seine Brüder. Stockholm: Bermann-Fischer Verlag, 1943.
The Sabbath Anthology. Edited by Abraham E. Millgram. Philadelphia: The Jewish Publication Society, 1944; reprinted 2018..

Morris Adler, Jacob B. Agus, and Theodore Friedman. "Responsum on the Sabbath." Proceedings of the Rabbinical Assembly, volume 14 (1950), pages 112–88. New York: Rabbinical Assembly of America, 1951. In Proceedings of the Committee on Jewish Law and Standards of the Conservative Movement 1927–1970, volume 3 (Responsa), pages 1109–34. Jerusalem: The Rabbinical Assembly and The Institute of Applied Hallakhah, 1997.

Frank Moore Cross Jr. Studies in Ancient Yahwistic Poetry, pages 83–127. Baltimore: Johns Hopkins University, 1950; reprinted Whitefish, MT: Literary Licensing, 2013. (on “The Song of Miriam”).
Abraham Joshua Heschel. The Sabbath. New York: Farrar, Straus and Giroux, 1951. Reprinted 2005.

Umberto Cassuto. A Commentary on the Book of Exodus. Jerusalem, 1951. Translated by Israel Abrahams, pages 155–207. Jerusalem: The Magnes Press, The Hebrew University, 1967.
Morris Adler. The World of the Talmud, pages 28–29. B'nai B'rith Hillel Foundations, 1958. Reprinted Kessinger Publishing, 2007. 
Frank Moore Cross Jr. "The Song of the Sea and Canaanite Myth." In Canaanite Myth and Hebrew Epic: Essays in the History of the Religion of Israel, pages 112–44. Harvard University Press, 1973.
David Noel Freedman. "Strophe and Meter in Exodus 15." In A Light unto My Path: Old Testament Studies in Honor of Jacob M. Myers. Edited by Howard N. Bream, Ralph D. Heim, and Carey A. Moore, pages 163–203. Philadelphia: Temple University Press, 1974.
Harvey Arden. "In Search of Moses." National Geographic. (January 1976): pages 2–37.
Peter C. Craigie. The Problem of War in the Old Testament, pages 25, 35–36, 38, 67. Grand Rapids, Michigan: William B. Eerdmans Publishing Company, 1978.
Robert R. Wilson, "The Hardening of Pharaoh's Heart." Catholic Biblical Quarterly, volume 41 (number 1) (1979): pages 18–36.
Hershel Shanks. "The Exodus and the Crossing of the Red Sea, According to Hans Goedicke." Biblical Archaeology Review, volume 7 (number 5) (September/October 1981).
Charles R. Krahmalkov. "A Critique of Professor Goedicke's Exodus Theories." Biblical Archaeology Review, volume 7 (number 5) (September/October 1981).
Elie Munk. The Call of the Torah: An Anthology of Interpretation and Commentary on the Five Books of Moses. Translated by E.S. Mazer, volume 2, pages 162–229. Brooklyn: Mesorah Publications, 1995. Originally published as La Voix de la Thora. Paris: Fondation Samuel et Odette Levy, 1981.
Harvey Arden. "Eternal Sinai." National Geographic, volume 161 (number 4) (April 1982): pages 420–61.
Trude Dothan. "Gaza Sands Yield Lost Outpost of the Egyptian Empire." National Geographic, volume 162 (number 6) (December 1982): pages 739–69.
Pinchas H. Peli. Torah Today: A Renewed Encounter with Scripture, pages 67–70. Washington, D.C.: B'nai B'rith Books, 1987.
Robert A. Coughenour. "A Search for Maḥanaim." Bulletin of the American Schools of Oriental Research, number 273 (February 1989): pages 57–66.
Mark S. Smith. The Early History of God: Yahweh and the Other Deities in Ancient Israel, pages xix–xx, 3, 47, 54–55, 74, 97. New York: HarperSanFrancisco, 1990.
Harvey J. Fields. A Torah Commentary for Our Times: Volume II: Exodus and Leviticus, pages 32–41. New York: UAHC Press, 1991. 
Marc A. Gellman. "A Tent of Dolphin Skins." In Gates to the New City: A Treasury of Modern Jewish Tales. Edited by Howard Schwartz. New York: Avon, 1983. Reissue edition, Jason Aronson, 1991.
Bernard F. Batto. "Red Sea or Reed Sea? How the Mistake Was Made and What Yam Sûp Really Means." Biblical Archaeology Review, volume 10 (number 4) (July/August 1984).
Marc Gellman. "The Dolphins of the Red Sea." In Does God Have a Big Toe? Stories About Stories in the Bible, pages 73–75. New York: HarperCollins, 1989.
Nahum M. Sarna. The JPS Torah Commentary: Exodus: The Traditional Hebrew Text with the New JPS Translation, pages 68–97. Philadelphia: Jewish Publication Society, 1991.
J. Gerald Janzen. "Song of Moses, Song of Miriam: Who Is Seconding Whom?" Catholic Biblical Quarterly, volume 54 (number 2) (April 1992): pages 211–20.
Lawrence Kushner. God Was in This Place and I, I Did Not Know: Finding Self, Spirituality and Ultimate Meaning, pages 26–27. Jewish Lights Publishing, 1993. (crossing the sea).
Nehama Leibowitz. New Studies in Shemot (Exodus), volume 1, pages 231–89. Jerusalem: Haomanim Press, 1993. Reprinted as New Studies in the Weekly Parasha. Lambda Publishers, 2010. 
Aaron Wildavsky. Assimilation versus Separation: Joseph the Administrator and the Politics of Religion in Biblical Israel, page 8. New Brunswick, New Jersey: Transaction Publishers, 1993. 
Walter Brueggemann. "The Book of Exodus." In The New Interpreter's Bible. Edited by Leander E. Keck, volume 1, pages 788–823. Nashville: Abingdon Press, 1994. 

Judith S. Antonelli. "The Shekhinah." In In the Image of God: A Feminist Commentary on the Torah, pages 167–74. Northvale, New Jersey: Jason Aronson, 1995. 
Ellen Frankel. The Five Books of Miriam: A Woman's Commentary on the Torah, pages 109–15. New York: G. P. Putnam's Sons, 1996. 
W. Gunther Plaut. The Haftarah Commentary, pages 149–66. New York: UAHC Press, 1996. 
Debbie Friedman. "Miriam's Song." In And You Shall Be a Blessing. Sisu Home Entertainment, 1997.
Sorel Goldberg Loeb and Barbara Binder Kadden. Teaching Torah: A Treasury of Insights and Activities, pages 107–12. Denver: A.R.E. Publishing, 1997. 
Robert Goodman. "Shabbat." In Teaching Jewish Holidays: History, Values, and Activities, pages 1–19. Denver: A.R.E. Publishing, 1997. 
William H.C. Propp. Exodus 1–18, volume 2, pages 461–622. New York: Anchor Bible, 1998. 
Susan Freeman. Teaching Jewish Virtues: Sacred Sources and Arts Activities, pages 69–84, 283–98. Springfield, New Jersey: A.R.E. Publishing, 1999..

Exodus to Deuteronomy: A Feminist Companion to the Bible (Second Series). Edited by Athalya Brenner, pages 15, 22, 31–34, 39–40, 50, 56, 81, 86, 92–93, 95–96, 105, 108–10, 116, 121–22, 136–39, 151, 159, 164, 190, 195, 198. Sheffield: Sheffield Academic Press, 2000. 
Jane Falk. "Rhetorical Questions: The First Words of the Children of Israel." In Torah of the Mothers: Contemporary Jewish Women Read Classical Jewish Texts. Edited by Ora Wiskind Elper and Susan Handelman, pages 430–46. New York and Jerusalem: Urim Publications, 2000. 
Israel Finkelstein and Neil Asher Silberman. "Did the Exodus Happen?" In The Bible Unearthed: Archaeology's New Vision of Ancient Israel and the Origin of Its Sacred Texts, pages 48–71. New York: The Free Press, 2001.
Avivah Gottlieb Zornberg. The Particulars of Rapture: Reflections on Exodus, pages 199–246. New York: Doubleday, 2001. 
Lainie Blum Cogan and Judy Weiss. Teaching Haftarah: Background, Insights, and Strategies, pages 21–29. Denver: A.R.E. Publishing, 2002. 
Michael Fishbane. The JPS Bible Commentary: Haftarot, pages 98–106. Philadelphia: Jewish Publication Society, 2002. 
John J. Collins. "The Zeal of Phinehas: The Bible and the Legitimation of Violence." Journal of Biblical Literature, volume 122 (number 1) (Spring 2003): pages 3–21. ("The Lord is a warrior." .).
Robert Alter. The Five Books of Moses: A Translation with Commentary, pages 388–415. New York: W.W. Norton & Co., 2004. 
Jeffrey H. Tigay. "Exodus." In The Jewish Study Bible. Edited by Adele Berlin and Marc Zvi Brettler, pages 133–43. New York: Oxford University Press, 2004. 
Professors on the Parashah: Studies on the Weekly Torah Reading Edited by Leib Moscovitz, pages 105–10. Jerusalem: Urim Publications, 2005. 
W. Gunther Plaut. The Torah: A Modern Commentary: Revised Edition. Revised edition edited by David E.S. Stern, pages 431–67. New York: Union for Reform Judaism, 2006. 
Suzanne A. Brody. "I'm still groping" and "Desert Heat." In Dancing in the White Spaces: The Yearly Torah Cycle and More Poems, pages 16, 78. Shelbyville, Kentucky: Wasteland Press, 2007. 
James L. Kugel. How To Read the Bible: A Guide to Scripture, Then and Now, pages 103, 217–32, 234, 237, 278, 291, 392, 414, 418, 425, 532, 631–32, 650. New York: Free Press, 2007. 
Kenton L. Sparks. “‘Enūma Elish’ and Priestly Mimesis: Elite Emulation in Nascent Judaism.” Journal of Biblical Literature, volume 126 (2007): 635–37. (“Priestly Mimesis in the Exodus Story”).
Wilda Gafney. Daughters of Miriam: Women Prophets in Ancient Israel. Fortress Press, 2008.
Robert Shreckhise. "The Problem of Finite Verb Translation in Exodus 15.1–18." Journal for the Study of the Old Testament, volume 32 (number 3) (March 2008): pages 287–310.
The Torah: A Women's Commentary. Edited by Tamara Cohn Eskenazi and Andrea L. Weiss, pages 379–406. New York: URJ Press, 2008. 
Thomas B. Dozeman. Commentary on Exodus, pages 298–398. Grand Rapids, Michigan: William B. Eerdmans Publishing Company, 2009. 
Reuven Hammer. Entering Torah: Prefaces to the Weekly Torah Portion, pages 95–100. New York: Gefen Publishing House, 2009. 
Rebecca G.S. Idestrom. "Echoes of the Book of Exodus in Ezekiel." Journal for the Study of the Old Testament, volume 33 (number 4) (June 2009): pages 489–510. (Motifs from Exodus found in Ezekiel, including the call narrative, divine encounters, captivity, signs, plagues, judgment, redemption, tabernacle/temple, are considered.).
Jay Michaelson. "Into Life: The Humanism of the Exodus: Parashat Beshalach (Exodus 13:17–17:16)." In Torah Queeries: Weekly Commentaries on the Hebrew Bible. Edited by Gregg Drinkwater, Joshua Lesser, and David Shneer; foreword by Judith Plaskow, pages 89–92. New York: New York University Press, 2009. 
Bruce Wells. "Exodus." In Zondervan Illustrated Bible Backgrounds Commentary. Edited by John H. Walton, volume 1, pages 211–24. Grand Rapids, Michigan: Zondervan, 2009. 
Jonathan P. Burnside. "Exodus and Asylum: Uncovering the Relationship between Biblical Law and Narrative." Journal for the Study of the Old Testament, volume 34 (number 3) (March 2010): pages 243–66..
Aaron Michael Butts. "A Note on neʾdārî in Ex 15:6." Vetus Testamentum, volume 60 (number 2) (2010): pages 167–71.

Jonathan Sacks. Covenant & Conversation: A Weekly Reading of the Jewish Bible: Exodus: The Book of Redemption, pages 95–123. Jerusalem: Maggid Books, 2010. 
Aaron Jonathan Chalmers. "A Critical Analysis of the Formula 'Yahweh Strikes and Heals.'" Vetus Testamentum, volume 61 (number 1) (2011): pages 16–33.
Joe Lieberman and David Klinghoffer. The Gift of Rest: Rediscovering the Beauty of the Sabbath. New York: Howard Books, 2011. 
William G. Dever. The Lives of Ordinary People in Ancient Israel: When Archaeology and the Bible Intersect, page 246. Grand Rapids, Michigan: William B. Eerdmans Publishing Company, 2012. 
Daniel S. Nevins. "The Use of Electrical and Electronic Devices on Shabbat." New York: Rabbinical Assembly, 2012.

Shmuel Herzfeld. "Defeating Evil: Thoughts on the Arizona Massacre." In Fifty-Four Pick Up: Fifteen-Minute Inspirational Torah Lessons, pages 93–99. Jerusalem: Gefen Publishing House, 2012. 
The Roman Missal: Study Edition, page 171. Collegeville, Minnesota: Liturgical Press, 2012. ( reflected in Christmas Eve Vigil Mass).
Torah MiEtzion: New Readings in Tanach: Shemot. Edited by Ezra Bick and Yaakov Beasley, pages 157–233. Jerusalem: Maggid Books, 2012. 
Bruce Herzberg. "Deborah and Moses." Journal for the Study of the Old Testament, volume 38 (number 1) (September 2013): pages 15–33.
Amiel Ungar. "Tel Aviv and the Sabbath." The Jerusalem Report, volume 24 (number 8) (July 29, 2013): page 37.
Sidney Slivko. "Az—the great and powerful: Who else can withhold his actions for the sake of giving all people freedom of choice?" The Jerusalem Report, volume 25 (number 2) (May 5, 2014): page 47.
Joshua Berman. "Was There an Exodus? Many are sure that one of Judaism's central events never happened. Evidence, some published here for the first time, suggests otherwise." Mosaic Magazine. (March 2, 2015).
Jonathan Sacks. Lessons in Leadership: A Weekly Reading of the Jewish Bible, pages 79–84. New Milford, Connecticut: Maggid Books, 2015. 
David Fohrman. The Exodus You Almost Passed Over. Aleph Beta Press, 2016. 
Jean-Pierre Isbouts. Archaeology of the Bible: The Greatest Discoveries From Genesis to the Roman Era, pages 108–13. Washington, D.C.: National Geographic, 2016. 
Jonathan Sacks. Essays on Ethics: A Weekly Reading of the Jewish Bible, pages 97–102. New Milford, Connecticut: Maggid Books, 2016. 
Shai Held. The Heart of Torah, Volume 1: Essays on the Weekly Torah Portion: Genesis and Exodus, pages 155–64. Philadelphia: Jewish Publication Society, 2017. 
Steven Levy and Sarah Levy. The JPS Rashi Discussion Torah Commentary, pages 50–52. Philadelphia: Jewish Publication Society, 2017. 
Bill Dauster. "Pharaoh's Administration Offers a Cautionary Tale for Today." Washington Jewish Week. January 11, 2018, page 19.
Michael Shelomo Bar-Ron. “A Notice About Manna and Uprooted Oppression at Serabit el-Khadim (Improved).” (2020).

External links

Texts
Masoretic text and 1917 JPS translation
Hear the parashah chanted 
Hear the parashah read in Hebrew

Commentaries

Academy for Jewish Religion, California
Academy for Jewish Religion, New York
Aish.com 
Akhlah: The Jewish Children's Learning Network
Aleph Beta Academy
American Jewish University—Ziegler School of Rabbinic Studies
Anshe Emes Synagogue, Los Angeles
Ari Goldwag
Ascent of Safed
Bar-Ilan University 
Chabad.org
eparsha.com
G-dcast
The Israel Koschitzky Virtual Beit Midrash
Jewish Agency for Israel
Jewish Theological Seminary
Kabbala Online
Mechon Hadar
Miriam Aflalo
MyJewishLearning.com
Ohr Sameach
Orthodox Union
OzTorah, Torah from Australia
Oz Ve Shalom—Netivot Shalom
Pardes from Jerusalem
Professor James L. Kugel
Professor Michael Carasik
Rabbi Dov Linzer
Rabbi Fabian Werbin
Rabbi Jonathan Sacks
Rabbi Sharon Brous 
RabbiShimon.com 
Rabbi Shlomo Riskin
Rabbi Shmuel Herzfeld
Rabbi Stan Levin
Reconstructionist Judaism 
Sephardic Institute
Shiur.com
613.org Jewish Torah Audio
Tanach Study Center
Teach613.org, Torah Education at Cherry Hill
TheTorah.com
Torah from Dixie 
Torah.org
TorahVort.com
Union for Reform Judaism
United Synagogue of Conservative Judaism
What's Bothering Rashi?
Yeshivat Chovevei Torah
Yeshiva University

Weekly Torah readings in Shevat
Weekly Torah readings from Exodus